Tuxedo is a residential suburb of Winnipeg, Manitoba. Prior to 1972, the community was incorporated as the Town of Tuxedo. Today, it is the wealthiest area of Winnipeg, with the highest property values.

It is located about 7 kilometres (4.5 miles) southwest of downtown Winnipeg and borders the Assiniboine River and Assiniboine Park on the north, Assiniboine Forest on the west, and Edgeland Boulevard to the east. It is also bordered by Kenaston Boulevard and Taylor Avenue, the latter street being named after Frank Trafford Taylor, who was a prominent resident of Tuxedo.

It is part of the city ward of Charleswood-Tuxedo-Westwood, as well as belonging to the provincial electoral district of Tuxedo, and the federal electoral district of Winnipeg South Centre.

History
What is known today as Tuxedo began when the land was purchased by a group of businessmen between 1903 and 1910 in order to establish a planned "exclusive residential-only suburban enclave" called Tuxedo Park, taking its name from a New York City suburb.

Between 1903 and 1905, the Tuxedo Park Company Limited, directed by Winnipeg-based real estate agent Frederick W. Heubach on behalf of American investors Frederick E. Kenaston, E. C. Warner, and Walter D. Douglas, began to purchase land in this area for a residential development. The company acquired farmland owned by Mary and Archibald Wright which, along with several smaller land purchases, brought the total area to about 1,200 hectares (3,000 acres). To transform the native scrub vegetation to what Heubach envisioned as a “Suburb Beautiful,” he hired architect and engineer Rickson A. Outhet of New York City to create an appropriate plan. The Outhet plan was never implemented.

In 1910, after acquiring additional land, Heubach and associates created the South Winnipeg Company, which absorbed the Tuxedo Park Company, and hired American landscape architects Olmsted Brothers to plan the subdivision. Their plan including a site intended for the University of Manitoba which, at the time, was located in downtown Winnipeg. Development of the area was delayed for a variety of reasons but investors continued to support the venture and a number of companies were created to manage land transactions and investment: Tuxedo (Winnipeg) Syndicate Limited, South Winnipeg Limited (later South Winnipeg 1923 Limited), Norwood (Winnipeg) Syndicate Limited, Warner Land Company, Tuxedo Estates Limited, Kenaston Realty Company, University Estates Limited, Assiniboine Estates Limited, Assiniboine Investments Limited, South Assiniboine Estates Limited, West Rydal Limited, and The Canadian Agency.

The Town of Tuxedo was formally incorporated on 24 January 1913, with Heubach as its first mayor and a four-member council. Other mayors included David R. Finkelstein (served 1915–1951), Cecil A. R. Lamont (1952–1961), and Clive K. Tallin (1961–1971). The Town had its own police department, fire department, and recreation commission, and was part of a health unit including St. James, Assiniboia, St. Vital, Fort Garry, and Charleswood. There were three public schools in the Town, managed by the Assiniboine South School Division No. 3, including Tuxedo School No. 1709, opened in 1927. Also in the late 1920s was the creation of Heubach Park, a purely residential subdivision within Tuxedo.

The Metropolitan Planning Commission indicated as far back as 1946 that Grant Avenue would be extended through the Town of Tuxedo. In the mid-1950s, a project to extend Grant Avenue through Tuxedo and onto Charleswood terminating at Roblin Boulevard would lead to the bisection of Heubach Park. However, Tuxedo mayor Cecil Lamont was opposed to this plan and preferred that the major thoroughfare be placed southward near Eldride. The Town changed its position by 1960, making way for the $50-million project, including an additional 1,600 homes and the westward extension of Grant Avenue over a 10-year period. The initial portion of the new subdivision would be located west of Heubach Park between Corydon Avenue and Mountbatten Road.

Until the 1960s, retail locations were prohibited in Tuxedo. Rules were eased to allow an apartment complex and small shopping mall, Tuxedo Park Shopping Centre, which opened on 30 October 1963. Liquor sales followed suit in 1969.

A monument celebrating the incorporation of the Town was installed in Heubach Park in July 1970, dedicated by the Metropolitan Corporation of Greater Winnipeg.

In 1972, Tuxedo amalgamated with Winnipeg and 12 other suburbs in the Unicity scheme. Records for the Tuxedo Park Company, as well as municipal records for Tuxedo, are now held at the City of Winnipeg Archives.

In the early 1990s, Larry Fleisher, who then represented Tuxedo at Winnipeg City Council, requested that $250,000 be spent on making Heubach Park nicer, and that the project commence by 1993.

In the 2010s, commercial development of Tuxedo South led to the opening of several shopping areas, including an IKEA store, an Outlet Collection mall, and Seasons of Tuxedo big-box cluster.

Locations

Neighbourhoods

Crime by neighbourhood
Tuxedo possesses quite low crime rates. The table below shows the crime rates of various crimes in each of the Tuxedo neighborhoods. The crime data spans 5 years from the year 2017 to the year 2021. The rates are crimes per 100,000 residents per year.

Schools
 Gray Academy of Jewish Education
 Canadian Mennonite University
 St. Paul's High School
 Shaftesbury High School
 Tuxedo Park School

Points of interest
 Assiniboine Park and Assiniboine Park Zoo
 Heubach Park
 Outlet Collection Winnipeg
 Rady Jewish Community Centre
 Rumors Comedy Club
 Tuxedo Park Shopping Centre
 Winnipeg Jewish Theatre
 Winnipeg Studio Theatre
International real estate developer, financier and former Lord Mayor of London, England, Sir Denys Lowson (via South Winnipeg Development Co. Ltd.), announced in March 1963 that Bird Construction was chosen as the company to build the Tuxedo Park Shopping Centre (2025 Corydon Avenue) designed by Smith Carter architects and opened on 30 October 1963. The new Centre included a 10-pin bowling alley and billiards. Other initial retailers were MacIver Nanton Toys, Height Hairstylists, and Tuxedo Book & Record Shop. A Bank of Montreal branch, Safeway supermarket, and Shell gas station continue to operate today. The Shopping Centre was phase 1 of 2 phases on 15 acres of land, with the second phase seeing the construction of 3 apartment towers.

Heubach Park (originally Olmsted Park) is a purely residential subdivision within Tuxedo that was created in the late 1920s. Heubach Park itself comprises 26 acres of landscaped land (trees, shrubs). At one time there was a flower bed at the southern edge of the Park at Grant Avenue, but it was later removed. As much as was possible, utility wires were buried, so as not to be visually cluttering.

Privately-owned and run and situated south of Assiniboine Park, the Tuxedo Golf Course was constructed between 1932 and 1933 and officially opened in May 1934. It features both regular 18-hole and 18-hole miniature golf runs.

References

External links
 Manitoba Communities: Tuxedo
 History and Walking Tour of Tuxedo

Neighbourhoods in Winnipeg
Former municipalities now in Winnipeg
Populated places disestablished in 1972
Tuxedo